Lazarus Sims (born March 28, 1972) is an American former professional basketball player. He also worked as the head coach of the Gulf Coast Lions of The Basketball League (TBL).

Sims played at Syracuse from 1992 to 1996. He averaged 7.4 assists per game in his final season at Syracuse. He ranks 8th on the school's all-time assist list with 432 assists. In August 2007, he returned to Syracuse after being appointed to head coach Jim Boeheim's staff as the player development coach.

College career

1992-93

1993-94

1994-95

1995-96

Professional career

Stats

College

Post-playing career
In August 2007, Sims was named the player development coach for Syracuse's men's basketball team, returning to his college program that he graduated from in 1996 and effectively ending his eleven-year professional playing career. In June 2012, Sims accepted a job at Binghamton University to work on the staff of the school's first-year coach Tommy Dempsey, joining as an assistant to the head coach.

Personal

References

External links
Lazarus Sims at cuse.com

1972 births
Living people
Basketball players from Syracuse, New York
Point guards
Syracuse Orange men's basketball players
American men's basketball players